Mikindani estate is an area within Jomvu Constituency which is mainly a suburban area of Mombasa. The estate lies along the Mombasa- Nairobi highway (A109 road). The estate is surrounded by the Indian ocean and is believed to have earned its name formerly from mikinda, meaning small minazi (young coconut palms) which are believed to have been growing in the area.

The estate has subdivision areas/villages in it namely:
Kwa Mwanzia
Amani
Kwa Ngombe
Ganahola
Kwashee
Staff
Kijiweni
Aldina.

Ganahola is the most experienced slam in Mikindani whereby starts from 'Corner Ya Kwashee' to 'Kwa Hussein Beach'. It's the smallest sub division in Mikindani and large number of population. Ganahola has sub-station names like;

Mikindani Stage
Corner Ya Kwashee
Kanisa Ya Makuti
Parking
St. Jude
Kwa Kitili
Joycar
Kwa Make Teckla
Kwa Paulo
Kwa Kabaso
Kwa Make Njoki
White House
Holy Base
Kwa Mbitini
Kwa Zeina
Kwa Dili
Kwa Make Karobo
Kwa Kulaunone
Kwa Fundi Wa Mastove
Big Ship
Nazarene
Kwa Ngului
Kwa Husseni
Pub Kwa Karisa
Kwa Kenga
Beach Ya Husseni

The area has experienced a growth in population due to the industrialization within the mainland.
In the estate, transport and communication, businesses, and vast growth in infrastructure is present compared to the way it was in the early 1990s.

Education and Religion
Education has vast grown with currently present with several nursery and pre- schools, three government primary schools in the area Amani, Mikindani and Kwashee, several private owned schools like the St.Kevin Hill Schools, Golden Key School, Nazarene Nursery & Primary School, one secondary school i.e., Kajembe High School and two technical training centers: Islamic Teachers Training College and the Mikindani Youth Polytechnic.

Being a cosmopolitan estate, there lives people of different language backgrounds presently but the majority being the Swahili. This has seen growth in religion amongst the many faithfuls who dwell in the estate. There are utmost six mosques, one catholic church St. Mathias Mulumba Catholic Church, St Mark's Anglican church, the Jehovah's witnesses Hall, PCEA Mikindani Church, Deliverance Church Mikindani and several more Pentecostal churches. Boasting of a vast population due to suburban growth, the estate has also center location for Hope World Wide Kenya and several children's home like the Baobab Family Children's Home and Grandsons of Abraham Rescue Centre.

Resources
The estate also houses different health centers e.g. the municipal clinic, Latullah medical center, Mikindani Medical, Joy medical center, Catholic Church Dispensary which offers VCT services and also administrative offices like the chiefs office, the surveyors department and the CDF office.

References

Mombasa County
Populated places in Coast Province
Mombasa